Korean Patriotic Organization, also known as Korean Patriotic Corps or Korean Patriotic Legion, was a secret organization that aimed to assassinate prominent Japanese figures of the Empire of Japan. It was one of the independence movements propelled by the Provisional Government of the Republic of Korea. The Korean Patriotic Organization was founded by Kim Gu, president of the Provisional Government of the Republic of Korea. Its executives were Kim Suk, Ahn Gong-geun, Lee Su-bong, and Lee Yu-pil. Notable members included Yoo Sang-geun, Yoo Jin-man, Yun Bong-gil, Lee Bong-chang, Lee Duk-ju, and Choi Heung-sik.

Background

On September 18, 1931, the Empire of Japan staged the Liutiaohu incident (bombing of the Manchu railroad) and Mukden Incident. The Chinese people's anti-Japanese fervor proliferated because of these incidents. To promote Korea–China relations and to revitalize the depressed independence movement, the Provisional Government of the Republic of Korea founded a secret organization which would carry out covert missions to assassinate key Japanese figures. That task was entrusted to Kim Gu.

Kim Gu organized the Korean Patriotic Organization with about 80 members, mostly patriotic Korean youngsters. The organization was based in Shanghai, China. Leaders included Kim Suk, Ahn Gong-geun, Lee Su-bong, and Lee Yu-pil; other notable members were Yoo Sang-geun, Yoo Jin-man, Yun Bong-gil, Lee Bong-chang, Lee Duk-ju, and Choi Heung-sik. The Provisional Government of the Republic of Korea hope to shock and halt Japan's aggression with assassinations.

Sakuradamon Incident

In late 1931, Kim Gu sent Lee Bong-chang to Tokyo to assassinate the Japanese Emperor Hirohito (昭和天皇). Bong-chang arrived in Tokyo in early January 1932. On January 8, Hirohito was exiting the Imperial Palace grounds, for a military review in a Tokyo suburb with Puyi, Emperor of Manchukuo. In front of the Sakuradamon Gate, Bong-chang threw a hand grenade that detonated away from Hirohito, killing some carriage horses. Bong-chang pulled out the Taegukgi (the national flag of South Korea) and shouted, "Daehan Dokrip Manse" (Long Live Korean Independence) three times. He was immediately arrested by police. Lee Bong-chang did not respond to any question by the police and was sentenced to death in a closed trial on September 30. He was executed in Ichigaya Prison on October 10.

This incident fueled the anti-Japanese independence movement. Kuomintang of China spotlighted this incident in its official organ, Kukmin Ilbo (Korean, 국민일보). At the same time, this and similar incidents led to Japan taking action in the form of the Shanghai War of 1932.

Hongkou Park Incident
(1932), by Yun Bong-gil)

On April 29, 1932, Yun Bong-gil carried out an attack using a bomb disguised as a water bottle (widely misconceived as a narrow lunch box).  Yun Bong-gil carried two bombs to Shanghai, one being the water bottle and the other being the lunch box. The water bottle was used to kill the target while the lunch box was intended to be used to kill himself after the assassination, but failed to detonate. He intended to use the bombs at a Japanese Army celebration of Hirohito's birthday in Hongkou Park, Shanghai.

The bombing killed Yoshinori Shirakawa (白川 義則), a general of the Imperial Japanese Army, and Kawabata Sadaji (河端 貞次), a Government Chancellor of Japanese residents in Shanghai. It also seriously injured Kenkichi Ueda (植田 謙吉), Division 9 commander of the Imperial Army, Kuramatsu Murai (村井倉松), Japanese Consul-General in Shanghai, and Mamoru Shigemitsu (重光 葵), Japanese envoy in Shanghai, and Kichisaburo Nomura (野村 吉三郎), admiral in the Imperial Navy who would later serve as the ambassador to the United States at the time of the attack on Pearl Harbor. Upon learning of the incident, Chiang Kai-shek, Chinese political and military leader who served as the leader of the Republic of China, highly praised it: "A million Chinese armies didn't make it, but one Korean did it".

Yun Bong-gil was arrested at the scene and convicted by the Japanese military court in Shanghai on May 25. He was transferred to Osaka prison on November 18, and executed by firing squad in Kanazawa on December 18. He was buried in the Nodayama graveyard.

Later history 
Other activities of the Korean Patriotic Organization included :
 An assassination attempt against the Governor-General of Korea, by Lee Duk-ju and Yoo Jin-man
 Assassination attempts against high officials of Japan, by Yoo Sang-geun and Choi Heung-sik

The Korean Patriotic Organization has been identified as being responsible for the assassination attempts. Following this, Japanese police authorities rushed to arrest key figures of the Provisional Government of the Republic of Korea by threatening the Shanghai French Concession. Many Korean activists sought refuge in Hangzhou and Jiaxing, through not all made it; among those arrested was Ahn Changho. The Provisional Government of the Republic of Korea eventually relocated to Hangzhou. Later it moved to Zhenjiang in 1935, and Nanjing in 1936. During that time, the activities of the Korean Patriotic Organization diminished.

List of members

Members of the Korean Patriotic Organization included :

President
 Kim Gu

Executives
 Kim Suk
 Ahn Gong-geun
 Lee Su-bong
 Lee Yu-pil

Members
 Yoo Sang-geun
 Yoo Jin-man
 Yun Bong-gil
 Lee Bong-chang
 Lee Duk-ju
 Choi Heung-sik

Influence
Influenced by the activities of the Korean Patriotic Organization, both Korea's anti-Japanese independence movement and China's anti-Japanese actions intensified. During the time that the Provisional Government of the Republic of Korea was active within Chinese territory, Kuomintang of China increased its support for this government after the Sakuradamon Incident and the Hongkou Park Incident. Eventually, the Korean Liberation Army was established.

See also

 Japan–Korea disputes
 Heroic Corps
 Assassination (2015 film)
 Korean National Association

References

Korean independence movement
History of Shanghai
Organizations based in Shanghai
Organizations established in 1931
Paramilitary organizations based in Korea
Terrorism in Japan